The Șoimoș is a right tributary of the river Mureș in Romania. It discharges into the Mureș in the village Șoimoș. The Hungarian name means "Hawkish Creek". The Romanian name derives from that.

References

Rivers of Romania
Rivers of Arad County